Anglo European School is a self-governing, co-educational international academy school situated in Ingatestone, Essex. It is a school for boys and girls of all abilities, with 1,306 pupils aged 11 to 19. It was the first state school in Britain to offer the International Baccalaureate Diploma and the first to become a Language College. The school offers opportunities to travel abroad, often on exchanges and learn many languages such as French, German, Spanish, Russian, Japanese, Italian, Chinese and Latin. The school became an academy in 2011, but still has languages as a specialism.

David Barrs and Jill Martin took over as headteachers of Anglo European School following the death of Bob Reed, who was headteacher at the time. They were officially appointed in 2006. With David Barrs leaving in 2021, the current headteacher is Jody Gee.

The school uses the twelve star European Flag as its crest and uses the phrase Making a World of difference as a motto. It is common to hear the school and its pupils and staff referred to as The Anglo Family.

Notable former pupils 
David Abraham, Chief Executive of Channel 4
Lydia Rose Bright, reality television star
Ben Drew, known as Plan B, rapper
Mario Falcone, reality television star
James Harper, footballer
John Heffernan, actor
Nadine Lewington, actress
Dan Wright, comedian
Lotte Wubben-Moy, footballer

See also 
 List of international schools

References

External links 

 
Learning Zone

Academies in Essex
Secondary schools in Essex
International Baccalaureate schools in England
Educational institutions established in 1973
1973 establishments in England